Lost is the first internationally released album by Danish electronic rock band Carpark North.

In 2009 Carpark North was contacted by Swedish label "Mr. Radar" who wanted to sign the band through Sony Music worldwide. The band re-recorded songs from their three studio albums, Carpark North (2003), All Things to All People (2005) and Grateful (2008), which resulted in the creation of the super album "Lost".

The album was released on 27 August 2010 in the United Kingdom and Germany, on 1 September 2010 in Europe, and on 14 September 2010 in North America.

The song "Save Me from Myself" was covered by Brazilian Christian rock band Oficina G3 and Christian musician Michael W. Smith.

Track listing

References

2010 albums
Carpark North albums